Karapaí (locally known as Estrella del Norte) is a municipality in Paraguay, located in the Amambay Department. It is the newest district created in this department, being it the fifth one.

References

External links
 Luz verde para que Karapai sea el quinto município del Amambay
Senadores aprobaron la distritación de Karapai como el 5º de Amambay

Populated places in the Amambay Department